Yaser Said Abu-Mostafa (Arabic: ياسر سعيد أبو مصطفى) is Professor of Electrical Engineering and Computer Science at the California Institute of Technology, Chairman of Paraconic Technologies Ltd, and Chairman of Machine Learning Consultants LLC. He is known for his research and educational activities in the area of machine learning.

Academic biography
Abu-Mostafa studied at Cairo University, where he earned the BSc degree in 1979. He earned the MS degree at the Georgia Institute of Technology in 1981 and the PhD degree at the California Institute of Technology in 1983. He has been on the faculty of the California Institute of Technology since 1983.

In 1987, Abu-Mostafa cofounded the Conference on Neural Information Processing Systems (NeurIPS), a major machine learning meeting.
He is known for his recent textbook on machine learning.
He has also developed an online course about machine learning.

References

External links
 Yaser S. Abu-Mostafa professional home page

1957 births
Living people
Georgia Tech alumni
California Institute of Technology alumni
California Institute of Technology faculty
American computer scientists